Samuel Alexander Reid (born 17 June 1872) was an Australian rules footballer who played with Carlton in the Victorian Football League (VFL).

Notes

External links 		
		
Sam Reid's profile at Blueseum				
		

1872 births
Australian rules footballers from Victoria (Australia)		
Carlton Football Club players
Year of death missing